SS Dainichi Maru (大日丸） was the name of a number of ships.

 , a Japanese cargo ship in service 1911–31
  a Japanese hell ship in the Second World War.
 , a refrigerated cargo ship used as a shellfish cannery from 1962–68.

References

Ship names